Vesyoloye is a rural locality (a selo) in Slavgorod, Altai Krai, Russia. The population was 36 as of 2013. There is 1 street.

References 

Rural localities in Slavgorod urban okrug